Brent Clifford Stuart is a rugby league coach and former player who represented New Zealand.

Playing career

Stuart was originally from the West Coast. He was educated at Marist Brothers High School, Greymouth.

A West Coast and Canterbury representative, Stuart spent two years in the Northern Territory in the mid-1980s and represented the Territory against Parramatta. In 1993 he was invited to be part of an Auckland Invitational XIII side that drew 16-all with the Balmain Tigers. Stuart was then selected to go on the 1993 New Zealand rugby league tour of Great Britain and France, playing in all five test matches. He then played for the Western Suburbs Magpies in the Australian competition.

Brent Stuart was a New Zealand international and played at the 1995 Rugby League World Cup.

In 1998 he returned to play for Canterbury.

Coaching career
Since 2007 Stuart has been coaching the Canterbury Bulls in New Zealand's Bartercard Premiership. Since 2008 Stuart has coached the Papanui Tigers. In 2009 he was named to coach the Bartercard Premiership Selection that took on Samoa.

Since 2010 Stuart has also coached the South Island side in the National Zonal Competition.

Canterbury's 44–16 defeat by Auckland on 4 June 2012 was Stuart's last match coaching representative football.

References

External links
World Cup 1995 details

1965 births
Living people
Addington Magpies players
Auckland rugby league team players
Canterbury rugby league team players
Canterbury rugby league team coaches
New Zealand national rugby league team players
New Zealand rugby league coaches
New Zealand rugby league players
South Island rugby league team players
South Island rugby league team coaches
Marist (West Coast) players
Rugby league players from Greymouth
Rugby league props
People educated at John Paul II High School, Greymouth
West Coast rugby league team players
Western Suburbs Magpies players